The Other Lamb is a 2019 horror film directed by Małgorzata Szumowska and written by C.S. McMullen. It stars Raffey Cassidy, Michiel Huisman and Denise Gough.

Plot summary 
Selah is a teenage girl who is living in a remote forest compound belonging to a polygamist cult. The cult's messianic leader, the Shepherd, is the only male in the group. The women are divided into two groups: the younger Sisters, who dress in shades of blue, and the older Wives, who dress in reddish tones. The group raises sheep for food and sacrificial rituals.  As she matures, Selah has become more of a focus of the Shepherd's attention, and she appears drawn to him. She frequently wonders about her mother, who died giving birth to her.

After fighting with one of the Sisters, Selah is ordered to deliver leftovers to a small, dark hut, where menstruating females are sent because they are considered "unclean".  Here she encounters Wife Sarah, who was banished to the hut for unspecified reasons.  Sarah, whose chest is covered with scars, warns Selah of the Shepherd's violent tendencies.

One night, Selah overhears a police officer telling the Shepherd that the group must leave. The Shepherd announces that he will be leading the women on a journey to a new home. During the walk, the Wives discover that Selah is menstruating, and she is forced to the back of the group with banished Wife, Sarah. Selah befriends Sarah, who explains that she and Selah's mom were the Shepherd's first two wives.  Sarah tells Selah that her mother did not die in childbirth, but instead contracted an infection a few days afterward and died of sepsis because the Shepherd would not take her to the hospital. Sarah admits that she has no faith in the Shepherd, but stays because she has no place else to go.  During the arduous journey, Selah begins to doubt his judgement. When she sees a car driving on a road, she has a fantasy of herself inside it, dressed as a normal teenager.

During the strenuous hike one of the pregnant Wives goes into labor, and she dies in childbirth. The Shepherd plucks the dead Wife's grieving young child off of the unlit funeral pyre, and throws her to the ground.  After the funeral, Sarah tells Selah that she is leaving with the baby, who the Shepherd had wanted to abandon in the wilderness because the baby was "born wrong". Sarah reveals that the Shepherd wanted to abandon the healthy baby because "there can only be one ram in a flock". Meanwhile, the Shepherd beats one of the Sisters, Tamar, for refusing to lead the group after announcing that she spotted a potentially promising location ahead, further eroding Selah's trust.

The group arrives at a forested valley with a large lake, which the Shepherd declares will be their new Eden. The Sisters’ faith has been shaken by the journey, but the Shepherd rebaptizes the older Sisters.  Selah has visions of him attempting to drowning her. Around the campfire the Wives decline dinner, stating they are fasting for their ritual the next day.  

That night, he calls Selah to his tent and rapes her. She fantasizes about the Sisters killing the Shepherd. The next morning, the Sisters awake to find the Wives missing. They go to the lake to find the Shepherd kneeling near the Wives' robes. He tells them that the Wives have ascended into a new life and the Sisters must replace them. Selah confronts him, telling him, "You are not our shepherd!" He smacks her and she hits him back. Some time later, police officers discover the bodies of the Wives washed up on the shore of the lake. They also discover the Shepherd's dead body suspended between two trees, a pair of ram's horns placed on his head like a faun. The Sisters, led by Selah, congregate at the waterfall near their original compound.

Cast
 Raffey Cassidy as Selah
 Michiel Huisman as Shepherd
 Denise Gough as Sarah
 Kelly Campbell as Hannah
 Eve Connolly as Adriel
 Isabelle Connolly as Eloise

Production
In February 2019, it was announced Raffey Cassidy, Michiel Huisman and Denise Gough had joined the cast of the film, with Małgorzata Szumowska directing from a screenplay by C.S. McMullen. Principal photography began that same month in County Wicklow, Ireland.

Release
The film had its world premiere at the Toronto International Film Festival on 6 September 2019. Shortly after, IFC Midnight and Mubi acquired US and UK distribution rights to the film, respectively. It was released in the United States on 3 April 2020 and was released in the United Kingdom on 16 October 2020.

Reception

Box office 
The Other Lamb grossed a total of $7,385 worldwide ($6,024 in the United States, and $1,361 internationally).

Critical reception 
The website's critics consensus reads "Smartly directed by Malgorzata Szumowska, The Other Lamb uses a young woman's coming-of-age story to explore the powerful hold cults can have on their followers." On Metacritic it has weighted average score of 65 out of 100, based on reviews from 17 critics, indicating "generally favorable reviews".

References

External links
 
 
 

2019 films
2019 horror films
American coming-of-age films
American horror films
Belgian coming-of-age films
Belgian horror films
Films about cults
Irish coming-of-age films
Irish horror films
Films directed by Małgorzata Szumowska
Zentropa films
Films set in forests
Films shot in County Wicklow
2010s feminist films
Films shot in Ireland
2010s English-language films
2010s American films